Carlo Fazzari (born 7 April 1990) is a former Italian rugby union player who played as a prop.

He played for Zebre in the Pro12, from 2012/13 to 2013/14. He currently plays for Petrarca Padova Rugby.

He played as prop for several Italian Teams, winning the national league in 2011. 

Owner of several clinics in his hometown Brescia. 
CEO of Brain Stimulation Italia, organization that provide neurostimulation treatments for mental health issues.

References

External links
Carlo Fazzari Profile

1990 births
Living people
Italian rugby union players
Petrarca Rugby players
Benetton Rugby players
Rugby union props